The Renewed African Socialist Movement is a political party in Chad. It is considered a moderate opposition party allied with the ruling Patriotic Salvation Movement (MPS), and it participates in the government as of 2007.

Brahim Koulamallah was the party's candidate in the May 2006 presidential election, taking fifth (and last) place with 5.31% of the vote.

References

Political parties in Chad
Socialist parties in Chad